Synaphe oculatalis is a species of moth of the family Pyralidae described by Émile Louis Ragonot in 1885. It is found in Spain and Turkey.

The wingspan is about 32 mm.

References

Moths described in 1885
Pyralini
Insects of Turkey